Palacky or Palacký (Czech feminine: Palacká) is a Czech language surname. It may refer to:

People
František Palacký (1798–1876), Czech historian and politician

Other uses
Palacký Bridge, Prague, Czech Republic
Palacky Township, Ellsworth County, Kansas, USA
Palacký University, Olomouc, Czech Republic
40444 Palacký, a main belt asteroid

See also
 

Czech-language surnames